Amourous Adventure (French: L'amoureuse aventure) is a 1932 French romantic comedy film directed by Wilhelm Thiele and starring Albert Préjean and Marie Glory. It was a French language version of the 1932 German film Madame Makes Her Exit which was also directed by Thiele and starred Liane Haid and Hans Brausewetter.

Partial cast
 Albert Préjean as Marcel Touzet
 Marie Glory as Irène Vernier
 Jeanne Boitel as Eve
 Mady Berry as Madame Touzet
 Marcel André as Jacques Vernier
 Armand Morins as Mister Touzet
 Aimé Clariond (unknown character name)
 Raymond Cordy (unknown character name)
 Paulette Dubost (unknown character name)

References

Bibliography
 Grange, William. Cultural Chronicle of the Weimar Republic. Scarecrow Press, 2008.

External links

1932 films
1932 romantic comedy films
French romantic comedy films
1930s French-language films
Films directed by Wilhelm Thiele
French multilingual films
French black-and-white films
Films with screenplays by Wilhelm Thiele
Films with screenplays by Franz Schulz
1932 multilingual films
1930s French films